Meet the Wife is a 1931 American comedy film directed by Leslie Pearce and starring Laura La Plante, Lew Cody and Joan Marsh. It is based on the 1923 Broadway play of the same title by Lynn Starling. The film's sets were designed by the art director Charles A. Cadwallader.

Synopsis
A woman's supposedly dead first husband turns up, much to the consternation of her second husband. Meanwhile, her younger sister attempts to carry on two romances with a newspaper reporter and a wealthy Englishman.

Cast
 Laura La Plante as Gertrude Lennox 
 Lew Cody as Philip Lord 
 Joan Marsh as Doris Bellamy 
 William Janney as Gregory Brown 
 Harry Myers as Harvey Lennox 
 Claud Allister as Victor Staunton 
 Aileen Carlyle as Alice 
 Aggie Herring as Maggie 
 Edgar Norton as Williams

References

Bibliography
 Munden, Kenneth White. The American Film Institute Catalog of Motion Pictures Produced in the United States, Part 1. University of California Press, 1997.
 Walker, Brent E. Mack Sennett’s Fun Factory: A History and Filmography of His Studio and His Keystone and Mack Sennett Comedies, with Biographies of Players and Personnel. McFarland, 2013.

External links

1931 films
1931 comedy films
American comedy films
Columbia Pictures films
Films directed by Leslie Pearce
American black-and-white films
American films based on plays
1930s English-language films
1930s American films